This table displays the top-rated primetime television series of the 2011–12 season as measured by Nielsen Media Research.

References

2011 in American television
2012 in American television
2011-related lists
2012-related lists
Lists of American television series